Ömer Kemaloğlu (born April 2, 1987 in Istanbul, Turkey) is a European champion Turkish karateka competing in the kumite -65 kg division. He is a member of the İstanbul Büyükşehir Belediyesi S.K. Now he is physical education teacher in Sultangazi Cumhuriyet Anatolian Highschool

Achievements
2013
  XVII Mediterranean Games – June 28, Mersin TUR – kumite -67 kg
  48th European Karate Championships – May 9, Budapest HUN – kumite -67 kg
  Karate1 Paris – January 19, Paris FRA – kumite -67 kg

2012
  47th European Karate Championships – May 10, Adeje ESP – kumite -67 kg
  16th Balkan Children & Seniors Karate Championships – March 16, Herceg Novi MNE – kumite -67 kg

2011
  9th European Karate Regions Championships – June 4, Ankara TUR – kumite team

2010
  1st World Clubs Cup – November 20, Istanbul TUR – kumite team

2009
  World Games in Kaohsiung – July 25, Taiwan- kumite -65 kg

2008
  43rd European Championships – May 2  Tallinn EST- kumite -65 kg
  Open de Paris – January 19, Coubertin FRA – kumite -65 kg

2007
  German Open – September 15, Aschaffenburg GER – kumite -65 kg 
  34th European Cadet & Junior Championships – February 9, Izmir TUR – kumite junior -65 kg
  34th European Cadet & Junior Championships – February 9, Izmir TUR – kumite junior team

2006
  41st European Championships – May 5, Stavanger NOR7 – kumite -60 kg
  33rd European Cadet & Junior Karate Championships – February 17, Podgorica, Serbia & Montenegro – kumite junior -65 kg

2005
  4th World Junior & Cadet Karate Championships – November 11 – kumite junior team
  32nd European Cadet & Junior Karate Championships – February 11,  Thessaloniki GRE – kumite cadet -65 kg

2004
  31st European Cadet & Junior Karate Championships – February 13 iRijeka CRO – kumite cadet -65 kg

References

External links
 

1987 births
Sportspeople from Istanbul
Turkish male karateka
Istanbul Büyükşehir Belediyespor athletes
Living people
Mediterranean Games gold medalists for Turkey
Competitors at the 2013 Mediterranean Games
World Games bronze medalists
Competitors at the 2009 World Games
Mediterranean Games medalists in karate
World Games medalists in karate
Islamic Solidarity Games medalists in karate
Islamic Solidarity Games competitors for Turkey